Completed in 1926 at a cost of $305,000, the Bell Street Bridge crosses the Yellowstone River in Glendive, Montana. It was listed on the National Register of Historic Places in 1988. At one time the main highway bridge over the river, Montana DOT rehabilitated and converted it for pedestrian use in 1992 when the bridge on the I-94 Business Loop was built 300’ to the north. Since then, each year in September the town celebrates the preservation and birthday of the bridge which is a central piece of Glendive's historic resources.

References

Road bridges on the National Register of Historic Places in Montana
Buildings and structures completed in 1926
Warren truss bridges in the United States
National Register of Historic Places in Dawson County, Montana
Bridges over the Yellowstone River
1926 establishments in Montana
Transportation in Dawson County, Montana